Mikel Zarrabeitia Uranga (born May 14, 1970, in Abadiño) is a Spanish former road bicycle racer.

In the 11th stage of the 2000 Vuelta a España, Zarrabeitia cut off the top of his finger. He was trying to repair his distance counter during the descent from Alt de la Rabassa when the accident happened.

Major results

1991
 3rd GP Villafranca de Ordizia
 5th Overall Euskal Bizikleta
1992
 1st  Overall Vuelta a La Rioja
1st Stage 2
 2nd Klasika Primavera
 3rd Overall Tour of the Basque Country
 7th Overall Volta a Catalunya
 7th Overall Vuelta a Aragón
 10th Overall Euskal Bizikleta
1993
 8th Subida al Naranco
 9th Overall Volta a Catalunya
1994
 2nd Overall Vuelta a España
1996
 4th Subida al Naranco
 5th Overall Euskal Bizikleta
1997
 1st Gran Premio Navarra
 1st Klasika Primavera
 2nd Overall Vuelta a Aragón
1st Stage 3
 3rd Overall Volta a Catalunya
 5th Tour du Haut Var
 6th Overall Tour of the Basque Country
 7th Overall Paris–Nice
 7th Subida a Urkiola
 9th Overall Critérium du Dauphiné Libéré
1998
 4th Overall Vuelta a La Rioja
 4th Overall Setmana Catalana de Ciclisme
 5th Overall Volta a la Comunitat Valenciana
 5th Subida al Naranco
 7th Overall Paris–Nice
 7th Overall Tour of the Basque Country
 7th Overall Euskal Bizikleta
1999
 5th Overall Vuelta a Murcia
 6th Overall Critérium International
 9th Overall Tour de Suisse
 9th Züri-Metzgete
 9th GP Villafranca de Ordizia
2000
 4th Overall Euskal Bizikleta
 6th Overall Vuelta a La Rioja
 10th Overall Tour of Galicia
2001
 3rd Overall Vuelta a Murcia
 4th Overall Euskal Bizikleta
1st Stage 1
 7th GP Miguel Induráin
 8th Overall Volta ao Algarve
2002
 1st  Overall Euskal Bizikleta
1st Stage 4b
 1st Prueba Villafranca de Ordizia
 3rd Overall Vuelta a Burgos
 4th Overall Volta a Catalunya
 8th Overall Vuelta a Andalucía
 10th Subida al Naranco
2003
 2nd Overall Paris–Nice
 9th Overall Vuelta a Andalucía

Grand Tour general classification results timeline

References

External links

Palmarès by cyclingbase.com 

1970 births
Living people
People from Abadiño
Cyclists from the Basque Country (autonomous community)
Spanish male cyclists
Sportspeople from Biscay